Kambo, also known as vacina-do-sapo, or sapo (from Portuguese "sapo", lit. meaning "toad"), is the dried skin secretions of the kambô, a species of frog, used as a transdermal medicine. 

Kambo is usually used in a group setting, called a Kambo circle or Kambo ceremony. The effects on humans usually include tachycardia, nausea, vomiting, and diarrhea, however, a meta-review of 50 studies in which 11 cases of acute intoxication were examined found that extreme cases may include psychosis (occasionally severe), SIADH, kidney damage (including acute renal failure), pancreas damage, liver damage including toxic hepatitis, dermatomyositis,  esophageal rupture, seizures, and death, although evidence for these is limited.

Kambo, which originated as a folk medicine practice among the Amazon indigenous peoples, is also administered as an alternative medicine treatment in the West, often as a pseudoscientific cleanse or detox. The ceremony involves burning an arm or leg and applying the kambo secretion directly to the burn. Promoters claim that kambo helps with several illnesses or injuries. There is no scientific evidence that it is an effective treatment.

It seems to be particularly dangerous to take a kambo with large quantities of water. Doing that is associated with SIADH and severe electrolyte imbalances: changes in plasma and urine osmolarity, hypokalemia, hypomagnesemia and hypophosphatemia. Naloxone is under study as a possible antidote; hospital treatment also includes medicines to protect organs from damage and restore electrolyte function.

Common terms 

 Kampo pae, name used by the Noke Kuin (formerly Katukina)
 Dow kiet, a word used by the Matses
 Sapo, kampô, kampu, vacina de sapo or vacina da floresta, in Brazilian Portuguese

"Kambô" is a common name of Phyllomedusa bicolor, an Amazonian tree frog, also known as the blue-and-yellow frog, bicolored tree-frog, giant monkey frog, giant leaf frog, or waxy-monkey tree frog. "Sapo" means "toad" in Spanish and Portuguese. The frog is an anuran amphibian that inhabits the Amazon and Orinoco basins in South America.

History 

Natives who practice kambo are Panoan-speaking indigenous groups in the southeast Amazon rainforest, such as the Mayoruna, Matses, Marubo, Amahuaca, Kashinawa, Katukina, Yawanawá, and the Kaxinawá. There are ethnographic studies on the use of kambo in traditional Noke Kuin medicine in the region of the state of Acre, in the Brazilian Amazon.

Since the mid-20th-century, kambo has also been practiced in urban regions of Brazil. In 2004, Brazil banned the sale and marketing of kambo. Import is illegal in Chile. Outside of South America, it first became known as an alternative therapy in the late 2010s.

In 2021 the Therapeutic Goods Administration of Australia (TGA) banned the use of Kambo in Australia and classified it as a schedule 10 poison. It is listed in the category for “substances of such danger to health as to warrant prohibition of sale, supply and use”.

Indigenous use

To collect the secretions from the frog's body, first, the frog has to be caught. A practitioner will tie the frog to four sticks placed in the ground with its limbs completely stretched. The pulling causes the frog to become stressed enough to activate its defense mechanism and secrete a substance containing peptides from its skin. After obtaining secretions, the frog goes back into the wild. The secretions are then left to dry. Small burns are created on the skin, and a small dose of the frog secretions applied to the open wounds. In native practice, the secretions are removed from the wounds after 15 to 20 minutes, ending the acute symptoms.

Traditional practitioners claim that it aids fertility, cleanses the body and soul, increases strength, and brings good luck to hunts. It is used by natives to expel "panema" (bad spirit) and to induce abortions. The secretions are also commonly used in people who suffer from tikish or laziness, a condition perceived as unfavorable by the Noke Kuin as the person stops participating socially.

Joaquim Luz, a Yamanawa leader, criticized commercial sales and kambo's use without the preparation or permission of indigenous peoples, saying that the toxin users are at risk of death. Other native groups have also expressed concerns.

Non-indigenous use
Outside South America, a kambo ceremony can involve just two people, the practitioner, the participant, or many participants at once, which is known as a kambo circle. Participants are encouraged to bring plenty of water, a towel, and a bucket. There are usually yoga mats on the floor and the ceremony room, which is often the practitioner's living room, is heavily incensed.

During the ceremony, the participant's skin is deliberately burnt multiple times, usually on the upper arm or leg, by the practitioner using a smoldering stick or vine. The practitioner uses saliva or water to reconstitute the frog secretions and place it on top of the burnt skin. Participants may be encouraged to shout "Viva" whenever one of them vomits into their bucket. Short-term effects include violent nausea, vomiting, diarrhea, edema (swelling) of the face, headaches, and tachycardia. The secretions seem to be vasoactive (affecting the circulation), explaining why they are absorbed rapidly.

Intoxication may occur immediately or within hours.

Medical claims
Non-indigenous users and practitioners of kambo claim that the alternative medicine helps with a wide variety of issues and conditions. These claims include treating addiction, depression, and chronic pain, reducing fevers, increasing fertility, boosting energy and physical strength, and improving mental clarity. It is also claimed that kambo removes negative energy and cleanses the soul and body.There is a report of a single patient with acute myeloid leukemia who normalized his blood cell count and reached a complete remission which lasted more than 4 years after kambo application (and without any chemotherapy), but the causal role of kambo in this positive outcome is not proven so far.

There is currently no scientific evidence to these claims. There is no solid medical evidence on how the frog toxins work, whether they are useful for treating anything, and whether they can be used safely: no clinical trials have tested them on humans, . Reports of adverse effects are numerous, including for use with experienced guidance. The possible use of some of the peptides, such as caerulein, for therapeutic purposes has been evaluated due to their intrinsic analgesic properties, however, the overall in vivo effects, i.e., the concomitant administration of all of these peptides to humans, still appear uncertain.

Kym Jenkins of the Royal Australian and New Zealand College of Psychiatrists, in a Sydney Morning Herald article, said "people with mental illness are a more vulnerable group anyway for a variety of reasons. If you're feeling very anxious or very depressed ... you're automatically more vulnerable and you could be more susceptible to people advertising or marketing a quick fix. I do have concerns that people can be preyed upon when they are more vulnerable."

The Australian Medical Association supports the Australian Therapeutic Goods Administrations ban on the sale, supply, and use of kambo, saying it considers kambo to be a “significant health risk”.

Marketing
In non-indigenous use, the frog secretion is described and marketed as a "detox" treatment, cleanse, purge, and as a "vaccine", which is "good for everything". Kambo has been marketed both as a "scientific" remedy, emphasizing the biochemistry, and as a "spiritual" remedy, emphasizing its indigenous origins. Purging (deliberate vomiting) has been a popular treatment since the 1800s. "Detox" has been described by Edzard Ernst, emeritus professor of complementary medicine, as a term for conventional medical treatments for addiction, which has been "hijacked by entrepreneurs, quacks, and charlatans to sell a bogus treatment."

In Brazil, given the growth in the consumption of kambo in urban centers, there has been criticism by indigenous people, academics and communicators regarding the cultural appropriation of indigenous knowledge, the process of extracting the secretion of the Phyllomedusa bicolor frog, the form of transmission of wisdom, and the price charged by the ritual and the mystification of the origin of the frog.

There is also concern about pharmacological patents on the peptides identified in kambo (see biopiracy), the commercialization of the kambo outside its place of origin, and the unknown impact on frog populations, since many more are now removed from their natural habitats.

In light of the chemical complexity of the frog toxins, and their complex and potentially fatal effects, the authors of a 2022 review on the diagnosis and treatment of kambo cases said they urged "strict surveillance of the websites that encourage the use of this substance and [we] urge greater control of e-commerce or illicit trafficking of animals and secretions, including through the dark web".

Environmental impact 
The effect of the increased use of kambô rituals, and trafficking of the frogs and their secretions, may have an effect on the population of Phyllomedusa bicolor in its natural habitats: the forests of Bolivia, Peru, Brazil, the Guianas, Colombia, and Venezuela. Phyllomedusa bicolor is not considered an endangered species by the IUCN. Besides Phyllomedusa (species?), other threatened endemic frog species of South America's neotropical regions have been poached and smuggled on the black market.

Parasitology 

Smuggling amphibians such as Phyllomedusa bicolor can spread parasites. Zoos keep frogs for conservation purposes, and there are many parasites present in these animals that naturally occur only in the native habitats. It is recommended for imported amphibians to go through a quarantine process to verify they are not spreading parasites that could damage other ecosystems. Parasite infection rates in frogs is 51%, while in salamanders it is 13%. Individuals who want to have them as pets are obligated and encouraged to get them examined to detect gastrointestinal parasites that could potentially be harmful. Neocosmocercella fisherae is the first nematode species found parasitising Phyllomedusa bicolor from the Brazilian Amazon Region.

Notable deaths 

A 40-year-old businessman was charged in Brazil in 2008 with the illegal exercise of medicine and felony murder after administering kambo toxins to a business colleague, who died; the deceased's son, who said his father had pressured him into participating, suffered more minor effects. In Chile in 2009, Daniel Lara Aguilar, who suffered from chronic lumbar disc disease, died immediately after taking kambo administered by a local shaman in a mass healing ceremony; the autopsy was inconclusive due to preexisting conditions. The medical literature reported the 2018 case in Italy of a person with no known preexisting conditions besides obesity, who, according to autopsy reports, died of cardiac arrhythmia while under the effects of kambo use. In March 2019, kambo practitioner Natasha Lechner suffered a cardiac arrest and died while receiving kambo. In April 2019, a homicide investigation was opened into the death by "severe cerebral edema" of a young person who had taken kambo toxins in Chile; the import of the frog and its secretions is illegal in Chile.

Pharmacology 

The frog secretes a range of small chemical compounds of a type called peptides, which have several different effects. Peptides found in the frog secretions include dermorphin and deltorphin. The peptides then bind to opioid receptors, sauvagine, a vasodilator, and dermaseptin, which exhibits antimicrobial properties in vitro. Various other substances such as phyllomedusin, phyllokinin, caerulein, and adrenoregulin are also present. There is active medical research into the peptides found in the skin secretions of Phyllomedusa bicolor, focusing on discovering their biological effects. There have been some preclinical trials in mice and rats, but no phase-1 tests or clinical trials of safety in humans, .

See also

Notes

References 

Pseudoscience
Alternative detoxification
Fringe science
Scientific skepticism
Alternative medicine
South American traditional medicine
Amphibians and humans
Amphibian diseases